The Hooligan Factory is a 2014 football hooliganism spoof film directed, co-written and starring Nick Nevern. The film heavily parodies titles from the British hooligan genre films and focuses mainly on The Firm, along with The Football Factory, Rise of the Footsoldier, I.D., Green Street and Cass.

Production
The film features numerous cameo appearances from actors who have been type cast in the Hooligan genre films. Leo Gregory has a minor role while there were cameos from Danny Dyer, Tamer Hassan, Craig Fairbrass and Tony Denham, who feature in one scene each, while there was also a cameo from former hooligan and inspiration behind the film Cass, Cass Pennant. Former West Ham United footballer Julian Dicks, The Only Way Is Essex personality Chloe Sims and Hollyoaks actor Charlie Clapham also make minor appearances. Dexter Fletcher also filmed a scene but it was cut from the final take.

Cast

 Jason Maza as Danny
 Nick Nevern as Dex
 Tom Burke as Bullet
 Ray Fearon as Midnight
 Steven O'Donnell as Old Bill
 Morgan Watkins as Trumpet
 Josef Altin as Weasel
 Leo Gregory as Slasher
 Keith-Lee Castle as The Baron
 Ronnie Fox as Danny Sr
 Lorraine Stanley as Sharon
 Juliet Oldfield as Karen
 Alex Austin as Fanta
 Ian Lavender as Grandad Albert
 Danny Dyer as Jeff
 Craig Fairbrass as Mickey
 Tamer Hassan as Jack
 Cass Pennant as Cass (himself)
 Julian Dicks as Slasher's Top Boy
 Paul William Arnold as Baron's Top Boy
 Chloe Sims as Chloe (herself)
 Tony Denham as Millwall's Top Boy
 Charlie Clapham as Freddy the Nonce
AJ Makin as The Screw

References

External links
 
 

2014 films
2010s sports comedy films
British parody films
British sports comedy films
2010s parody films
British association football films
Films set in London
Films about drugs
2014 comedy films
Films shot at Elstree Film Studios
2010s English-language films
2010s British films